"Don't Want to Forgive Me Now" is a song by Scottish band Wet Wet Wet, released as the third single from their sixth studio album, Picture This (1995), on 5 June 1995. It reached number seven on the UK Singles Chart and reached the top 20 in Iceland and Ireland. Marti Pellow recorded his own version of the song for inclusion on his 2002 album Marti Pellow Sings the Hits of Wet Wet Wet & Smile.

Track listings

UK CD1
 "Don't Want to Forgive Me Now"
 "In the Ghetto" (live)
 "Gypsy Girl" (live acoustic)

UK CD2
 "Don't Want to Forgive Me Now"
 "Love Is All Around" (live)
 "Angel Eyes" (acoustic and live)

UK cassette single
 "Don't Want to Forgive Me Now"
 "In the Ghetto" (live)

Australasian CD single
 "Don't Want to Forgive Me Now"
 "Love Is All Around" (Radio One live show)
 "Angel Eyes" (live Radio One acoustic)
 "In the Ghetto"

Credits and personnel
Credits are lifted from the UK CD1 liner notes and the Picture This album booklet.

Studios
 Recorded between November 1994 and January 1995 at Miraval (Var, France) and Whitfield Street (London, England)

Personnel

 Wet Wet Wet – production, arrangement
 Graeme Clark – writing, fretless bass, assorted basses, production
 Tommy Cunningham – writing, drums, percussion
 Neil Mitchell – writing, keyboards, piano
 Marti Pellow – writing, vocals
 Paul Spong – trumpet

 Neil Sidwell – trombone
 Chris White – saxophone
 Graeme Duffin – all guitars, production
 Bob Clearmountain – mixing
 Ian Morrow – programming
 Simon Vinestock – engineering

Charts

References

1995 singles
1995 songs
Mercury Records singles
Songs written by Graeme Clark (musician)
Songs written by Marti Pellow
Songs written by Neil Mitchell (musician)
Songs written by Tommy Cunningham
Wet Wet Wet songs